Motuloa may refer to:

 Motuloa (Funafuti), an island in Funafuti, Tuvalu
 Motuloa (north of Nukufetau), an island in Nukufetau, Tuvalu
 Motuloa (south of Nukufetau), an island in Nukufetau, Tuvalu